NOTE: Commons links to Eristalinus quinquestriatus
Eristalinus quinquelineatus is an African, European and Asian species of hoverfly.

References

Eristalinae
Insects described in 1781
Diptera of Europe
Diptera of Africa
Diptera of Asia